Charles Ying is a Cantopop singer and actor from Hong Kong. After singing the theme song Do I Still Love You of the film , he was signed by Leon Lai of East Asia Record Production and became one of the new hotly promoted new artists in 2005.

After receiving a degree from the Rhode Island School of Design, he became a Hong Kong-based Nike, Inc. designer. According to HK01, his songs largely have to do with "bitter love", including "Do I Still Love You", "How Can I Lose My Love", "It's My Bad", "Thank You for Lonely".

Discography

Cantonese albums

Filmography
 Fire of Conscience (2010)
 Bruce Lee, My Brother (2010)
 ICAC Investigators 2011 (2011)
 Once Upon a Song (2015)
 Beyond the Rainbow (2015)
 Love in Time (2015)

References

External links 
East Asia: Amusic Website (in traditional chinese)

1979 births
Living people
Hong Kong male singers
Rhode Island School of Design alumni